Mexisphodrus is a genus of ground beetles in the family Carabidae. There are about 12 described species in Mexisphodrus, found in North America.

Species
These 12 species belong to the genus Mexisphodrus:

 Mexisphodrus boneti (Bolivar y Pieltain & Hendrichs, 1964)  (Mexico)
 Mexisphodrus cancuc Barr, 1982  (Mexico)
 Mexisphodrus cuetzalan Barr, 1982  (Mexico)
 Mexisphodrus gertschi Hendrichs & Bolivar y Pieltain, 1966  (Mexico)
 Mexisphodrus profundus Barr, 1966  (Mexico)
 Mexisphodrus purgatus Barr, 1982  (Mexico)
 Mexisphodrus spiritus Barr, 1982  (Mexico)
 Mexisphodrus tlamayaensis Barr, 1966  (Mexico)
 Mexisphodrus urquijoi Hendrichs & Bolivar y Pieltain, 1978  (Mexico)
 Mexisphodrus valverdensis Barr, 1982  (North America)
 Mexisphodrus veraecrucis Barr, 1965  (Mexico)
 Mexisphodrus zoquitlan Barr, 1982  (Mexico)

References

Platyninae